[[File:WPA-Rumor-Poster.jpg|200px|thumb|right|The 1930s Works Progress Administration poster depicts a man with WPA shovel attacking a wolf labeled 'rumor.]]
A rumor (American English), or rumour (British English; see spelling differences; derived from Latin  'noise'), is "a tall tale of explanations of events circulating from person to person and pertaining to an object, event, or issue in public concern."

In the social sciences, a rumor involves a form of a statement whose veracity is not quickly or ever confirmed. In addition, some scholars have identified rumor as a subset of propaganda. Sociology, psychology, and communication studies have widely varying definitions of rumor.

Rumors are also often discussed with regard to misinformation and disinformation (the former often seen as simply false and the latter seen as deliberately false, though usually from a government source given to the media or a foreign government).

 Early work 
French and German social science research on rumor locates the modern scholarly definition of it to the pioneering work of the German William Stern in 1902. Stern experimented on rumor involving a "chain of subjects" who passed a story from "mouth to ear" without the right to repeat or explain it. He found that the story was shortened and changed by the time it reached the end of the chain. His student was another pioneer in the field, Gordon Allport.

The experiment is similar to the children's game Chinese whispers.

A Psychology of Rumor (1944)
He defines rumor as 
<blockquote>
a proposition for belief of topical reference disseminated without official verification. So formidably defined, rumor is but a special case of informal social communications, including myth, legend, and current humor. From myth and legend it is distinguished by its emphasis on the topical. Where humor is designed to provoke laughter, rumor begs for belief.
</blockquote>

Knapp identified three basic characteristics that apply to rumor: 
 they're transmitted by word of mouth; 
 they provide "information" about a "person, happening, or condition"; and 
 they express and gratify "the emotional needs of the community." 
Crucial to this definition and its characteristics is the emphasis on transmission (word of mouth, which then was heard and reported in the newspaper); on content ("topical" means that it can somehow be distinguished from trivial and private subjects—its domain is public issues); and on reception ("emotional needs of the community" suggests that though it is received by an individual from an individual, it is not comprehended in individual but community or social terms).

Based on his study of the newspaper column, Knapp divided those rumors into three types:
 Pipe dream rumors: reflect public desires and wished-for outcomes (e.g. Japan's oil reserves were low and thus World War II would soon end).
 Bogie or fear rumors reflect feared outcomes (e.g. An enemy surprise attack is imminent).
 Wedge-driving rumors intend to undermine group loyalty or interpersonal relations (e.g. American Catholics were seeking to avoid the draft; German-Americans, Italian-Americans, Japanese-Americans were not loyal to the American side).

Knapp also found that negative rumors were more likely to be disseminated than positive rumors. These types also differentiate between positive (pipe dream) and negative (bogie and wedge-driving) rumors.

 The Psychology of Rumor (1947) 
In the 1947 study, The Psychology of Rumor, Gordon Allport and Leo Postman concluded that, "as rumor travels it [...] grows shorter, more concise, more easily grasped and told." This conclusion was based on a test of message diffusion between persons, which found that about 70% of details in a message were lost in the first 5-6 mouth-to-mouth transmissions.

In the experiment, a test subject was shown an illustration and given time to look it over. They were then asked to describe the scene from memory to a second test subject. This second test subject was then asked to describe the scene to a third, and so forth and so on. Each person's reproduction was recorded. This process was repeated with different illustrations with very different settings and contents.

Allport and Postman used three terms to describe the movement of rumor. They are: leveling, sharpening, and assimilation. Leveling refers to the loss of detail during the transmission process; sharpening to the selection of certain details of which to transmit; and assimilation to a distortion in the transmission of information as a result of subconscious motivations.

Assimilation was observed when test subjects described the illustrations as they ought to be but not as they actually were. For example, in an illustration depicting a battle-scene, test subjects often incorrectly reported an ambulance truck in the background of the illustration as carrying "medical supplies," when, in fact, it was clearly carrying boxes marked "TNT (102)."

 Social Cognition 
In 2004, Prashant Bordia and Nicholas DiFonzo published their Problem Solving in Social Interactions on the Internet: Rumor As Social Cognition and found that rumor transmission is probably reflective of a "collective explanation process." This conclusion was based on an analysis of archived message board discussions in which the statements were coded and analysed. It was found that 29% (the majority) of statements within these discussions could be coded as "sense-making" statements, which involved, "[...] attempts at solving a problem."

It was noted that the rest of the discussion was constructed around these statements, further reinforcing the idea of collective problem solving. The researchers also found that each rumor went through a four-stage pattern of development in which a rumor was introduced for discussion, information was volunteered and discussed, and finally a resolution was drawn or interest was lost.

For the study, archived discussions concerning rumors on the internet and other computer networks such as BITnet were retrieved. As a rule, each discussion had a minimum of five statements posted over a period of at least two days. The statements were then coded as being one of the following: prudent, apprehensive, authenticating, interrogatory, providing information, belief, disbelief, sense-making, digressive, or un-codable. Each rumor discussion was then analysed based on this coding system. A similar coding system based on statistical analysis was applied to each discussion as a whole, and the aforementioned four-stage pattern of rumor discussion emerged.

There are four components of managing rumors that both of you need to understand for the sake of your relationship’s success. The first, anxiety (situational and personality), is when people who either have a more anxious personality, or people who are in an anxiety- lifting situation are more likely to create rumors in order to relieve some of their insecurities. The second component of managing rumors is ambiguity. Ambiguity is when someone is not sure about what is going on, so they end up assuming the worst. The third component is information importance. . Information is key, and if that information is not juicy or if it does not interest people, there won’t be rumors, but information can often be false. Information can also be ambiguous. The last component of managing rumors is credibility.''' Rumors are often spread by sources that are not credible. A rumor itself is not credible unless it is proven to be true. That is why people say to never trust the tabloids.

 Political Communication Strategy 
Rumor has always played a major role in politics, with negative rumors about an opponent typically more effective than positive rumors about one's own side.

 
In the past, much research on rumor came from psychological approaches (as the discussion of Allport and DiFonzio demonstrates above). The focus was especially on how statements of questionable veracity (absolutely false to the ears of some listeners) circulated orally from person to person. Scholarly attention to political rumors is at least as old as Aristotle's Rhetoric; however, not until recently has any sustained attention and conceptual development been directed at political uses of rumor, outside of its role in war situations. Almost no work had been done until recently on how different forms of media and particular cultural-historical conditions may facilitate a rumor's diffusion.

The Internet's recent appearance as a new media technology has shown ever new possibilities for the fast diffusion of rumor, as the debunking sites such as snopes.com, urbanlegend.com, and factcheck.org demonstrate. Nor had previous research taken into consideration the particular form or style of deliberately chosen rumors for political purposes in particular circumstances (even though significant attention to the power of rumor for mass-media-diffused war propaganda has been in vogue since World War I; see Lasswell 1927). In the early part of the 21st century, some legal scholars have attended to political uses of rumor, though their conceptualization of it remains social psychological and their solutions to it as public problem are from a legal scholarly perspective, largely having to do with libel and privacy laws and the damage to personal reputations.

Working within political communication studies, in 2006, Jayson Harsin(reprinted in Michael Ryan (ed.). 2008. Cultural Studies: An Anthology. London: Blackwell. introduced the concept of the "rumor bomb" as a response to the widespread empirical phenomenon of rumoresque communication in contemporary relations between media and politics, especially within the complex convergence of multiple forms of media, from cell phones and internet, to radio, TV, and print. Harsin starts with the widespread definition of rumor as a claim whose truthfulness is in doubt and which often has no clear source even if its ideological or partisan origins and intents are clear. He then treats it as a particular rhetorical strategy in current contexts of media and politics in many societies. For Harsin a "rumor bomb" extends the definition of rumor into a political communication concept with the following features:
 A crisis of verification. - A crisis of verification is perhaps the most salient and politically dangerous aspect of rumor. Berenson (1952) defines rumor as a kind of persuasive message involving a proposition that lacks 'secure standards of evidence' (Pendleton 1998).
 A context of public uncertainty or anxiety about a political group, figure, or cause, which the rumor bomb overcomes or transfers onto an opponent.
 A clearly partisan even if an anonymous source (e.g. "an unnamed advisor to the president"), which seeks to profit politically from the rumor bomb’s diffusion.
 A rapid diffusion via highly developed electronically mediated societies where news travels fast.

In addition, Harsin locates the "rumor bomb" within other communication genres, such as disinformation (intentional false information) and propaganda, as rumor has been viewed by others. However, he distinguishes it from these concepts as well, since disinformation is often too associated with government, and propaganda is attempts to control opinion without regard for ethics and accuracy of statement. Similarly, "spin" is a generic term for strategic political communication that attempts to frame or re-frame an event or a statement in a way that is politically profitable for one side and detrimental to another, though at its core it may simply be a red herring (Bennett 2003, p. 130).

In addition, a "smear campaign" is a term that loosely means a coordinated effort to attack a person's character. Unlike a "smear campaign," rumor bombs need not be about discrediting a person (as is the case, for example, in claims about Iraq and 9/11 or weapons of mass destruction moved to Syria). "Spin" also specifically refers to an event and its re-framing. Rumor bombs may seek to produce events themselves.
 
A rumor bomb can be seen as having some characteristics of these general concepts, but rumor bombs happen in very particular cultural and historical conditions. They are not about mouth-to-ear interpersonal rumors as much rumor research has been interested in. They begin in a rapport between deliberate "disinformers" and media, whether TV news, talk shows, newspapers, radio, or websites. They then circulate across these media, perhaps but not necessarily resulting in interpersonal mouth-to-ear rumor diffusion.(see more recent developments of the concept and case studies in "Diffusing the Rumor John Kerry is French, i.e. Haughty, Cowardly, Foppish, Socialist and Gay," in R. Given and S. Soule eds. The Diffusion of Social Movements, New York: Cambridge University Press (2010)

Harsin distinguishes the rumor bomb from other more general concepts of rumor by emphasizing changes in politics, media technology, and culture''. According to Harsin, rumor in politics has always existed, but recent changes have created an environment ripe for a new kind of political rumor: a new media "convergence culture" where information produced on the internet can influence the production of media content in other forms; new media technologies and business values that emphasize speed and circulation that combine with entertainment values in news, political marketing, and public craving of tabloid news that mirrors other entertainment genres.

Rumors of affairs, of "weapons of mass destruction" and their alleged removal to other countries"John Kerry is French," Obama is a Muslim, John McCain had an illegitimate black child—all of these involve statements whose veracity is in question or that are simply false. Other statements may have an ambiguous nature that makes them potentially appealing to different audiences who may interpret them in particular ways and circulate them. Harsin builds on rumor research that has emphasized social cognition and diffusion of propaganda. He extends Prashant and Difonzio's work in particular, since they attempt to distinguish rumor from gossip, in that rumor is supposedly about public issues and gossip is about private, trivial things. The emergence of infotainment and tabloidization in especially American and British news has broken that distinction, since politics is now just as much about bringing the private into the public view, as was clear with the Clinton-Lewinsky scandal.

Strategic Communication 
Similar to their appearance and function in political communication, wherein rumors can be deployed for specific deleterious effect (rumor bomb) or can otherwise plague a candidate for office, rumors also play an important role in strategic communication. Strategic communication is the process of crafting messages in support of specific organizational goals, and is usually concerned with governments, militaries and Non-Governmental Organizations (NGOs). Adroit strategic communication requires an understanding of stories, trends and memes circulating within a culture.

Rumors can be viewed as stories that seem rational but that are steeped into speculation, in connection with a certain narrative landscape (the vast array of cultural expression circulating within a community or region). In their book, Narrative Landmines: Rumors, Islamist Extremism and the Struggle for Strategic Influence, co-authors Daniel Bernardi, Pauline Hope Cheong, Chris Lundry and Scott W. Ruston coin the term narrative IED to help explain the function and danger of rumors in a strategic communication context. Rumors, as narrative IEDs, are low-cost, low-tech communication weapons that can be used by anyone to disrupt the efforts of communication, civil affairs or outreach campaigns such as those undertaken by governments in crisis response situations or militaries in insurgencies. As Bernardi notes, "Like their explosive cousins, rumors can be created and planted by nearly anybody, require limited resources to utilize, can be deadly for those in its direct path, and can instil fear".

See also 
 Apple community
 Blind item
 Snopes - website for checking the truth of rumors
 Pheme, a project addressing the detection and spread of rumors over social media
 Hoax
 Circular source
 Fake news
 Gossip
 Urban legend

References

External links 
 Spread of false information causes dangers

Human communication
Propaganda
Urban legends